The 1961–62 Swedish Division I season was the 18th season of Swedish Division I. Djurgardens IF won the league title by finishing first in the final round.

First round

Northern Group

Southern Group

Qualification round

Final round

External links
 1961–62 season

Swe
Swedish Division I seasons
1961–62 in Swedish ice hockey